Dannemarie is the name or part of the name of several communes in France:

 Dannemarie, Doubs, in the Doubs department
 Dannemarie, Haut-Rhin, in the Haut-Rhin department
 Dannemarie, Yvelines, in the Yvelines department
 Dannemarie-sur-Crète, in the Doubs department